Västerås BK30 is a sports club in Västerås, Sweden, established on 29 November 1929 as a merger out of IK City and IK Sture and named after 1930, the year it joined the Swedish Sports Confederation. The club nowadays mostly runs soccer, earlier even bandy, handball, ice hockey, table tennis and track and field athletics.

The soccer activity has mostly used Ringvallens IP as home ground. In 1969, a women's soccer team was established, which played in the Swedish top division in 1994.

Up to the mid 1980s bandy was a major sport. The club played in the Swedish top division in 1932 and 1936.

BK30 Dam Fotboll (women's soccer) 2016 season 
In the 2016 Swedish Division 1 season, Västerås BK30 finished first and was promoted to Elitettan following a two game playoff versus Jitex Mölndal BK.

Goal scores 
This is a list of all the goal scores for the 2016 season.

First-team squad 
As of 15 May 2016

Players
as of February 2020

References

External links
Official website 

1929 establishments in Sweden
Athletics clubs in Sweden
Defunct bandy clubs in Sweden
Defunct ice hockey teams in Sweden
Football clubs in Västmanland County
Sport in Västerås
Association football clubs established in 1929
Bandy clubs established in 1929
Ice hockey clubs established in 1929
Sports clubs established in 1929
Swedish handball clubs
Table tennis clubs in Sweden
Multi-sport clubs in Sweden